Anomonotes annulipes is a species of beetle in the family Cerambycidae. It was described by Heller in 1917. It is known from New Caledonia.

References

Enicodini
Beetles described in 1917